The Soatá Formation is a geological formation of the northern Altiplano Cundiboyacense, Eastern Ranges of the Colombian Andes. The formation consists mainly of shales with conglomerates and dates to the Quaternary period; Late Pleistocene epoch. It contains the lacustrine and fluvio-glacial sediments of elongated paleolake Soatá, that existed on the Altiplano in the valley of the Chicamocha River.

Fossils of the gomphothere Haplomastodon waringi, the capibara Neochoerus sp. and the deer species Odocoileus cf. salinae have been found in the Soatá Formation.

Knowledge about the formation has been provided by Colombian geologists Carlos Villarroel, Jorge Brieva and others.

Etymology 
The formation was first proposed and named after Soatá by Villarroel et al. in 2001. The type locality is defined near Portugalete, Soatá.

Regional setting 

The Altiplano Cundiboyacense, in the Eastern Ranges of the Colombian Andes, was formed late in the regional uplift of the Andean orogeny. It is estimated that the main stage of uplift happened during the Plio-Pleistocene. The Western and Central Ranges were submerged much earlier, leaving a corridor to the Caribbean in the Neogene.

The compression in the Andean orogenic belt caused the formation of fold and thrust belts in the Eastern Ranges, where Cretaceous and Jurassic normal faults were inverted as thrust faults lifting up the Paleozoic (Floresta and Cuche Formations), Mesozoic and Paleogene strata. A hiatus existed on the Altiplano between the Late Eocene and Late Miocene, in several parts of the Altiplano continuing until the Pleistocene.

During the glacials and interglacials of the Pleistocene ("ice ages"), several paleolakes formed on the Altiplano Cundiboyacense, of which Lake Humboldt on the Bogotá savanna was the most extensive (approximately ). Rivers were restricted during the drier glacial periods and the vegetation changed from páramo to Andean forest between the glacials and stadials and interglacials and interstadials.

Description

Lithologies 
The Soatá Formation consists of whitish calcareous claystones and sandy siltstones with plagioclase, hematite, zircon, green and reddish biotite, hornblende and crystalline calcite in its upper, older terrace. This unit also contains foraminifera and fragments of shells.

The middle, younger unit is composed of basal greyish claystones with non-uniform matrix-supported conglomerates at the upper section. The uppermost layer contains siltstones, probably of volcaniclastic origin.

The youngest sediments are found deepest in the basin and consist of claystones and greenish matrix-supported conglomerates. Rootlets and mammal fossils are more abundant in this layer.

Stratigraphy 
The Soatá Formation unconformably overlies the Cretaceous Capacho Formation, and is overlain by the Holocene infill sediments of the Chicamocha River, the course of which severely eroded and fragmented the Soatá formation. The formation is subdivided into three units of different lithological character and sedimentary dip in a terrace setting. The Soatá Formation is time-equivalent with the upper part of the Sabana Formation on the Bogotá savanna and the Chinauta deposits near Fusagasugá in the southwest of the Altiplano. Two samples were analysed for radiometric dating and provided ages of 45,900 ± 1,600 and 39,600 ± 800 years BP. This corresponds to the Chicagota interstadial and the Tagua stadial, when the glaciations were at their maximum extent.

Depositional environment 
The depositional environment has been interpreted as lacustrine (Lake Soatá) and fluvio-deltaic.

Fossil content 
In the Soatá Formation, fossils of Haplomastodon waringi, Neochoerus sp. and Odocoileus cf. salinae have been found. The fossil content is fragmentary.

Outcrops 

The Soatá Formation is apart from its type locality Portugalete found around Soatá (Jútua), and stretches to the north near the border of Boyacá and Santander, northeast of Tipacoque. To the south, the formation may have reached until Socotá.

Regional correlations

See also 

 Geology of the Eastern Hills
 Geology of the Ocetá Páramo
 Geology of the Altiplano Cundiboyacense

Notes

References

Bibliography 
 
 
 
 
 
 
 

Geologic formations of Colombia
Pleistocene Colombia
Shale formations
Lacustrine deposits
Fossiliferous stratigraphic units of South America
Paleontology in Colombia
Formations
Geography of Boyacá Department
Muysccubun